Dika Angkasaputra Moerwani Nasution (born 28 December 1984), known as Raditya Dika, is an Indonesian author, actor, movie director, and social media personality. He became famous as a comedian and represented stand-up comedy in the Indonesian television program.

He wrote six national bestselling books and starred as the main character in Cinta Brontosaurus (2013), Manusia Setengah Salmon (2013), Marmut Merah Jambu (2014) and Koala Kumal (2016) on the title of the books he wrote. He also appeared in a TV comedy serial called "Malam Minggu Miko" on Kompas TV, jury of Stand Up Comedy Indonesia and Stand Up Comedy Academy and host of Comic Action on Indosiar. He is also one of the first Indonesian YouTubers who received "Youtube Partner Rewards" and the first Indonesian YouTuber to gain more than 1 million subscribers.

Early life and education
Raditya Dika is the eldest of five siblings. He has three younger sisters and one younger brother: Ingga, Anggi, Yudhita, and Edgar.

He graduated from SMP Tarakanita and SMA 70 Bulungan. He continued his education at Adelaide University but left due to personal reasons, later he joined the extension program in Universitas Indonesia, majoring in Politics.

Bibliography

Filmography

References

External links
 
 Official Web

Living people
1984 births
21st-century Indonesian male actors
Indonesian bloggers
Indonesian film directors
People of Batak descent
Male bloggers
Indonesian YouTubers